Roberta Farinelli (born 6 February 1975) is an Italian former synchronized swimmer who competed in the 1996 Summer Olympics.

References

1970 births
Living people
Italian synchronized swimmers
Olympic synchronized swimmers of Italy
Synchronized swimmers at the 1996 Summer Olympics